This is a list of episodes for the Japanese anime television series Full Moon o Sagashite. The series is an adaptation of the manga Full Moon Wo Sagashite by Arina Tanemura. It was produced by Studio Deen and directed by Toshiyuki Kato. It was broadcast in 52 episodes on TV Tokyo from April 6, 2002 to March 29, 2003. The adaption follows the manga closely until Mitsuki's first audition as a singer, before diverging. Several characters have different histories and personalities, and the television series concluded before the manga did, with a different resolution.

The television series is licensed by Viz Media, who released the first 28 episodes on seven DVDs under the title Full Moon (although the full title appears on the cover) as of December 2007. The songs are subtitled only, resulting in a dub that switches between English dialogue and Japanese singing. The series is also available on Hulu, which has begun to show episodes beyond the DVD release.


Episodes
Note: This list uses Viz's official English-translated titles through episode 28, unofficial Japanese translations thereafter.

References

Full Moon o Sagashite